Bistra is a village in northeastern Bulgaria, in the Targovishte Municipality of the Targovishte Province.

Bistra Glacier on Smith Island in the South Shetland Islands, Antarctica is named after the village.

References

Villages in Targovishte Province